Ian Whitehead (born 28 December 1946) is a Scottish retired semi-professional football centre forward who played in the Scottish League for Ayr United, Queen's Park and Berwick Rangers. He was capped by Scotland at amateur level and had a successful period in Scottish non-league football as player-manager of Selkirk.

Honours 
Selkirk
 East of Scotland League (3): 1974–75, 1975–76, 1976–77
 Scottish Qualifying Cup (South) (3): 1973–74, 1974–75, 1976–77
 King Cup (2): 1974–75, 1975–76
 East of Scotland Qualifying Cup (2): 1973–74, 1975–76

References 

Scottish footballers
Scottish Football League players
Queen's Park F.C. players
Association football forwards
Scotland amateur international footballers
Place of birth missing (living people)
Vale of Leithen F.C. players
Ayr United F.C. players
Berwick Rangers F.C. players
Selkirk F.C. players
Scottish football managers
1946 births
Living people
Selkirk F.C. managers